Michaelston-y-Fedw is a small rural village and community to the west of the city of Newport, Wales, on the borders of Cardiff city and Caerphilly county boroughs. The population in 2011 was 296.

The name, which is a partial Anglicization of the Welsh Llanfihangel-y-fedw – meaning "church enclosure (of) Michael (in) the birches" – may also be seen spelt "Michaelstone-y-Fedw", "Michaelston-y-Vedw" and "Michaelstone-y-Vedw", the parish church being dedicated to Saint Michael.

There is a local pub called the Cefn Mably Arms. It first opened in 1824. Since 2017, the local vicar blesses the beer, the public house and the village entire in a special, public ceremony.

The community is bounded by the Rhymney River to the west, the A48(M) motorway to the south, and the Pound Hill road to the north and east. It contains Michaelston itself as well as a small cluster of houses known as Michaelstone Bridge or Lower Michaelstone about a mile to the north.

Community interest fibre network

On 25 June 2018 the village became the first community in Wales to create its own fibre network, connecting homes and businesses to the Internet with fibre to the premises, giving each a connection speed of 1Gbit/s, and became known as ‘The Fastest Village in Wales’. The network was designed and installed by volunteers from the community.

On 19 November 2018 Michaelston-y-Fedw Internet CIC (MyFi, the community interest company set up to run the fibre broadband project in the village) was awarded the European Broadband Award for Innovative Models of Financing, Business and Investment.

Government 

The area is governed by the Newport City Council.

References

External links

Michaelston-y-Fedw Community website

Communities in Newport, Wales
Villages in Newport, Wales
Community interest companies
Community interest companies in Wales